Juventus Corazón is a Peruvian football club, playing in the city of Majes, Arequipa, Peru.

History
Juventus Corazón is of the clubs with greater tradition in the city of Majes, Arequipa.

In the 2004 Copa Perú, the club classified to National Stage but was eliminated by Unión Grauina of Apurímac.

The club was runner-up in the 2009 Liga Superior de Arequipa.

Honours

Regional
Región VII:
Winners (1): 2004

Liga Departamental de Arequipa:
 Runner-up (3): 2003, 2004, 2009

Liga Provincial de Caylloma:
Winners (4): 2002, 2003, 2016, 2022
 Runner-up (1): 2008

Liga Superior de Arequipa:
 Runner-up (1): 2009

Liga Distrital de Majes:
Winners (3): 2002, 2003, 2016

See also
List of football clubs in Peru
Peruvian football league system

External links
 Liga Superior de Arequipa 2009

Football clubs in Peru